Joanna Worek (born 23 January 1986) is a Polish and Czech chess player holding the title of Woman Grandmaster (WGM).

In 2001, she won the bronze medal at the World Youth Chess Championship in the Girls U16 category. Worek transferred national federations from Poland to Czech Republic in 2016. In the same year she won the Czech Women's Chess Championship.

In team events, Worek played for Poland in the Women's Chess Olympiad of 2012 and the Women's European Team Chess Championship in 2013. Since 2016, she has played for the Czech team in the Women's Chess Olympiad, the Women's European Team Championship and the Women's Mitropa Cup.

References

External links 
 
 
 
 

1986 births
Living people
Chess woman grandmasters
Czech female chess players
Polish female chess players
Chess Olympiad competitors
People from Pszczyna
Sportspeople from Silesian Voivodeship